Nagpur West Assembly constituency is one of the seats in Maharashtra Legislative Assembly in India.. It is one of the six vidhan sabha segments of  Nagpur Lok Sabha seat.

Overview
Nagpur West (constituency number 56) is one of the 12 Vidhan Sabha constituencies located in the Nagpur district. It is one of the wealthiest constituencies in Nagpur. Areas where the rich and famous of Nagpur live, like Civil Lines, Byramji Town and Ramdaspeth fall in this constituency.

It is a part of the Nagpur Lok Sabha constituency along with five other Vidhan Sabha segments in this district, namely, Nagpur South West, Nagpur South, Nagpur East, Nagpur Central and Nagpur North(SC).

Members of Legislative Assembly

Election Results

1957 Vidhan Sabha
  A.B. Bardhan (Independent) : 26616 
 Shambharkar Punjabrao Hukam (SC)  SCF : 25878 
 Borkar Anusayabai  (SC)  INC : 24073 
 Gawande Wamanrao Govindrao  (INC) : 24012 
 Awari Manchearsha Rusramji  (PSP) : 11822

1962 Vidhan Sabha
 Sushilatai Balraj (INC) : 12,859 votes
 A B Bardhan ( CPI) : 12,701
 Govind Gopal Bambulkar (Independent) : 11,059
 Sumatitai Suklikar (Jana Sangh) : 6,385

1967 Vidhan Sabha
 Sushilabai Balraj (INC) : 25,694 votes
 Sumati B. Suklikar (BJS) : 16,793

1972 Vidhan Sabha
 Sushilabai Balraj (INC) : 25,410 votes
 Sumati Balkrishna Suklikar (BJS) : 20,896

1978 Vidhan Sabha
 Mulak Bhaurao Govindrao (INC-I) : 45,625 votes
 Sumatibai Suklikar (Janata Party) : 33,531 votes
 Sushila Balraj (Congress-Socialist) : 5,072 votes. Third place.

2004 Vidhan Sabha
 Devendra Gangadhar Fadnvis (BJP) : 113,143 votes
 Deshmukh Ranjeetbabu (INC) : 95,533

See also
 List of constituencies of Maharashtra Vidhan Sabha

References 

Assembly constituencies of Nagpur district
Politics of Nagpur
Assembly constituencies of Maharashtra